Manuel Gerardo Ureña Picado (born 6 July 1955) is a retired Costa Rican football player who played most of his career with Deportivo Saprissa, during the 1970s and 1980s. He is the current manager of Costa Rican Primera División side Belén.

Club career
With Saprissa, he won three national championships, starting off as part of the Saprissa team that won 6 national championships in a row during the 70's. He later had spells at San Carlos and Pérez Zeledón.

International career
Nicknamed  el Puro, Ureña played for Costa Rica, earning 7 caps. He represented his country in 3 FIFA World Cup qualification matches in 1980.

Managerial career
He has also coached Costa Rica national football team, at the U-17 level but was fired in October 2008 after coaching different national age group teams for over 100 matches. In September 2010 he was announced manager of second division Aserrí.

He became minor league coordinator at Saprissa in 2012. In February 2015, Ureña was appointed manager of Belén.

References

1955 births
Living people
Association football midfielders
Costa Rican footballers
Costa Rica international footballers
Deportivo Saprissa players
A.D. San Carlos footballers
Municipal Pérez Zeledón footballers
Costa Rican football managers
Deportivo Saprissa non-playing staff